Alejandro Velasco Fariñas (born 23 December 1986), known as Jano, is a Spanish professional footballer who plays as a defensive midfielder.

Club career

Early years
Born in Madrid, Jano was a CF Rayo Majadahonda youth graduate, and made his first-team debut during the 2006–07 season, in Tercera División. In 2008 he signed with Segunda División B club CD Leganés, terminating his contract on 4 September 2009 and joining Rayo Vallecano's reserves in the fourth division.

Jano helped Rayo B in their promotion to the third level in 2010, but was sparingly used afterwards. He subsequently moved to amateurs CD Puerta Bonita, leaving in January 2012 for Austrian Football Second League side SKN St. Pölten.

Austria
Jano made his professional debut on 2 March 2012, starting and scoring his team's second goal in a 3–2 home win over FC Lustenau 07. A regular starter, he netted the equaliser in the 2013–14 Austrian Cup final against FC Red Bull Salzburg, but in an eventual 2–4 loss.

In the summer of 2014, Jano signed for SV Mattersburg in the same country and league. He helped to promotion to the Bundesliga in his first season, as champions.

Jano made his debut in the Austrian top flight on 25 July 2015, starting in the 2–1 home defeat of Salzburg. He scored his first goal in the competition on 26 September, his team's second in a 4–2 away loss to the same opposition.

In August 2020, shortly after renewing his contract for a further two years, Jano became a free agent after Mattersburg's main financial backer was closed down and the club was subsequently dissolved.

Later career
Jano returned to Spain on 5 October 2020, agreeing to a one-year deal with CF Fuenlabrada. He played his first match in Segunda División the following month at the age of 33 years and 11 months, as a 64th-minute substitute in the 3–0 victory at AD Alcorcón.

Honours
Mattersburg
Austrian Football First League: 2014–15

References

External links

1986 births
Living people
Spanish footballers
Footballers from Madrid
Association football midfielders
Segunda División players
Segunda División B players
Tercera División players
CF Rayo Majadahonda players
CD Leganés players
Rayo Vallecano B players
CF Fuenlabrada footballers
Austrian Football Bundesliga players
2. Liga (Austria) players
SKN St. Pölten players
SV Mattersburg players
Spanish expatriate footballers
Expatriate footballers in Austria
Spanish expatriate sportspeople in Austria